Out-of-State Plates is a double compilation album by the American rock band Fountains of Wayne. It was released on Virgin Records on June 28, 2005.

Details
The album, a two-disc compilation of non-album tracks and previously unreleased recordings spanning the group's entire career, contain two brand new songs, "Maureen" and "The Girl I Can't Forget", as well as the first official release of the group's 1999 version of Britney Spears's "...Baby One More Time". Also featured is a rare live version of the Electric Light Orchestra song, "Can't Get It Out of My Head". According to bassist and songwriter Adam Schlesinger, "The reason we really wanted to do this compilation record is that we do like a lot of these songs and we do want people to be able to hear them. But there are also a few things that are tossed off and goofy and this seems like the proper context to present them in." Lead singer and fellow songwriter Chris Collingwood added, "The album may not hold up thematically like some of our others, but I still really like it."

Track listing
All songs written by Chris Collingwood and Adam Schlesinger, except where noted.

Disc 1
 "Number 45 Sunblock" – 0:21
 "Maureen" (Previously unreleased track) – 3:13
 "California Sex Lawyer" (Contribution to International Pop Overthrow Vol 3 compilation) – 2:59
 "Janice's Party" (B-side from "Radiation Vibe" single) – 2:45
 "Karpet King" (B-side from "Radiation Vibe" single) – 4:05
 "Baby I've Changed" (B-side from "Hey Julie" single) – 2:06
 "I Know You Well" (B-side from "Denise" single & Utopia Parkway - Japan Bonus Track) – 3:25
 "You're Just Never Satisfied" (B-side from "Troubled Times" single) – 3:07
 "I'll Do the Driving" (B-side from "Denise" single) – 3:23
 "Nightlight" (B-side from "Red Dragon Tattoo" single) – 3:02
 "I Want You Around" (B-side from "Survival Car" single) – 2:39
 "Trains and Boats and Planes" (Burt Bacharach, Hal David) (B-side from "Stacy's Mom" single) – 3:00
 "Places" (B-side from "Barbara H." single) – 1:39
 "Can't Get It Out of My Head" (live) (Jeff Lynne) (B-side from "Sink to the Bottom" single) – 3:53
 "Everything's Ruined" (Acoustic version from Future Soundtrack for America - Japan Bonus Track)

Disc 2
 "City Folk Morning" – 0:13
 "The Girl I Can't Forget" (Previously unreleased track) – 3:24
 "...Baby One More Time" (Max Martin) (Previously unreleased track) – 3:20
 "Elevator Up" (B-side from "Stacy's Mom" single & Welcome Interstate Managers - Japan/iTunes Bonus Track) – 4:10
 "Comedienne" (B-side from "Survival Car" single) – 3:39
 "Kid Gloves" (B-side from "Sink to the Bottom" single) – 3:30
 "Today's Teardrops" (Gene Pitney, Aaron Schroeder) (B-side from "Red Dragon Tattoo" single) – 2:07
 "She's Got a Problem" (live) (B-side from "Barbara H." single) – 3:09
 "These Days" (Jackson Browne) (B-side from "Troubled Times" single) – 2:34
 "I Want an Alien for Christmas" (Released in 1997 as a non-album single) – 2:19
 "The Man in the Santa Suit" (B-side from "I Want An Alien For Christmas" single) – 2:40
 "Chanukah Under the Stars" (B-side from "I Want An Alien For Christmas" single) – 0:15
 "Killermont Street" (Roddy Frame) (B-side from "Hey Julie" single) – 3:13
 "Half a Woman" (From unreleased Pinwheel Demos album & Contribution to Launch magazine, Issue 12) – 2:49
 "Small Favors" (Previously unreleased track) – 2:59
 "Imperia" (B-side from "Radiation Vibe" single) – 1:57

Personnel 
Fountains of Wayne

 Chris Collingwood – lead vocals, rhythm guitar, keyboards, production
 Jody Porter – lead guitar, backing vocals
 Adam Schlesinger – bass guitar, backing vocals, keyboards, drums, guitar, production, mixing
 Brian Young – drums, percussion

Charts

References

External links

Out-of-State Plates at YouTube (streamed copy where licensed)

Christgau, Robert (July 2005). "Baby One More Time". The Village Voice.

Fountains of Wayne albums
B-side compilation albums
2005 compilation albums
Virgin Records compilation albums
Albums produced by Adam Schlesinger